Gramgeeta: an epic on Indian village life is a book of poetry authored by Rashtra Saint Tukdoji Maharaj. This book is an ideal reference for developing village community.

The book has the following significant conclusions in it:

1. God cannot be found in Temples, Churches and Mosques as he is everywhere.

2. The best devotion to God is human upliftment

3. Forget the fast traditions and teach younger generation tradition that make your village proud of its achievement.

4. O'God, Your power perfection has not penetrated in us and thus ignorance prevails amongst us.

5. The touch of divine knowledge makes one understand what is wrong and right

6. People have become weak, ignorant, dome due to belief in blind faith in God and Dharam

7. Our talent does not belong to us alone for our enjoyment it is meant for development of the village.

Tukdoji Maharaj also wrote the poem bodhamruth which is used in an educational syllabus.
हर देशमे तू हर भेष में तू
तेरे नाम अनेक तू एकही है।

First edition
Wardha, Maharashtra : Rashtrasant Sahitya Prachar Mandal, 1979
Gramgeeta available in Hindi, English, Marathi language.
Gramgeeta now available in Gujarati language also.

External links
 Gramgeeta English translation online

Indian poetry collections